Subh Sukh Chain was the national anthem of the Provisional Government of Free India.

The song was based on a  Bengali poem Bharoto Bhagyo Bidhata by Rabindranath Tagore. When Subhash Chandra Bose shifted to Southeast Asia from Germany in 1943, he, with the help of Mumtaz Hussain, a writer with the Azad Hind Radio, and Colonel Abid Hasan Safrani of the INA, rewrote Tagore’s Jana Gana Mana into the Hindustani Subh Sukh Chain for use as the national anthem. Bose then went to what was then the INA broadcasting station at the Cathay Building in Singapore and asked Capt. Ram Singh Thakuri to compose the music for a song translated from Rabindranath Tagore's original Bengali score. He asked him to give the song a martial tune. 

India attained independence on 15 August 1947, and the next morning Jawaharlal Nehru unfurled the tricolour on the ramparts of the Red Fort and addressed the nation. It was on this occasion that Captain Thakuri was invited to play the tune of Subh Sukh Chain along with the members of his orchestra group.

History 

During the Indian independence movement, the song Vande Mataram was frequently sung at protest meetings, including the proclamation of the Provisional Government of Free India in Singapore in October 1943.  Some Muslims were, however, not comfortable with the expressly Hindu metaphors used in the song, and disliked the book, Anandamath, in which it had been first published.  The leaders of the Indian National Army in Singapore were aware of this problem, and hoped that Subhas Chandra Bose, the head of the INA and the Azad Hind, would settle it. Lakshmi Sahgal, who was an INA member, favoured the selection of Jana Gana Mana, which was composed by Rabindranath Tagore and had been sung at sessions of the Indian National Congress.  She arranged to have it sung at a women's meeting attended by Bose.  Bose was taken by the song, which he thought was nationally representative.  However, he did not like that the song was in Sanskritized Bengali, and commissioned a free translation to Hindustani.

The translation, Subh Sukh Chain, was written by Captain Abid Hasan Safrani, and its score composed by Captain Ram Singh Thakuri. It took Vande Mataram's place as the official national anthem of the Provisional Government, and was sung at all meetings, including at the final assembly before Bose's departure.

On 24 January 1950, President-elect Rajendra Prasad announced the final decision that Jana Gana Mana would be the national anthem of India.

Lyrics
The text of the anthem is

See also
 Jana Gana Mana, the National Anthem of India
 Abid Hasan
 Vande Mataram, the National Song of India
 Amar Shonar Bangla, the National Anthem of Bangladesh
 Indian National Army
 Capt. Ram Singh Thakuri

References

Indian patriotic songs
Indian National Army
Azad Hind
Memorials to Rabindranath Tagore